Joan McIntyre (born 1949 or 1950)  is a former BC Liberal Member of the Legislative Assembly, in the province of British Columbia, Canada. She was elected to represent the riding of West Vancouver-Garibaldi in the 2005 election. In 2009 she was re-elected to the same riding under its new name of West Vancouver-Sea to Sky.

McIntyre previously sat on the Cabinet Committee on Families and is the chair of the Select Standing Committee on Children and Youth. She previously served as Minister of State for Intergovernmental Relations from June 2008-June 2009. As well, McIntyre previously sat on four Cabinet Committees: Agenda and Priorities, Agenda Development, Legislative Review and Treasury Board. She also served as the Deputy Chair of the Select Standing Committee on Public Accounts, and was a member on the Select Standing Committee on Crown Corporations and the Agricultural Planning Government Caucus Committee.

McIntyre grew up in Toronto, Ontario, and attended the University of Toronto's Trinity College. She graduated with an Honours BA in Political Science in 1971. In 1980 she founded the polling firm McIntyre & Mustel Research Associates Ltd. She sold her interest in the firm in 1996.

References

External links
 Joan McIntyre, MLA for West Vancouver-Sea to Sky
 Official Biography, Legislative Assembly of British Columbia

British Columbia Liberal Party MLAs
Women MLAs in British Columbia
Year of birth missing (living people)
Living people
21st-century Canadian politicians
21st-century Canadian women politicians
Women government ministers of Canada
Members of the Executive Council of British Columbia
Trinity College (Canada) alumni